John Nevil Insall (1930–2000) was a pioneering English orthopaedic surgeon who contributed extensively to the advancement of orthopedic surgery and total knee replacement surgery. Dr. Insall designed four models of widely used systems including the ground breaking Total Condylar Knee in 1974.

Dr. Insall was born in Bournemouth, England to Margaret Insall (nee Allen) and James Insall. He attended Corpus Christi College, Cambridge, graduating in 1953. He worked as a physician and orthopedic surgeon in England and Canada before joining the Hospital for Special Surgery (HSS) in New York City. He founded the Insall Scott Kelly Institute for Orthopaedics and Sports Medicine (ISK) after a nearly 30-year career at HSS and the Knee Society.

In addition to his pre-eminent knee textbook Surgery of the Knee (Churchill-Livingstone, 1984, 2000), Dr. Insall wrote approximately 150 peer-reviewed articles, 41 book chapters and 5 books. He has also trained over 200 orthopaedic residents and 100 national and international knee fellows throughout his academic career.

He died of lung cancer on 30 December 2000, at Beth Israel Medical Center in Manhattan. Dr. Insall is survived by his wife Mary, children John and Amanda, and his grand children John and Emi Insall.

His publications include the following:
 Current concepts in primary and revision total knee arthroplasty (Lippincott-Raven, 1996)
 Surgery of the knee, Volume 1 (Churchill Livingstone, first edition 1984, second edition 2000)

The Insall award was established to honor Dr. Insall's achievements and contributions to orthopaedics. This award recognises outstanding papers concerning clinical results and techniques. The John N. Insall Travelling Fellowship is awarded to four candidates internationally. This allows those individuals to travel to prominent knee surgery centers.

The John N. Insall Foundation continues to advance orthopedic surgery.

References
 
 

1930 births
2000 deaths
English surgeons
British orthopaedic surgeons
Deaths from lung cancer in New York (state)
Medical doctors from Bournemouth
Alumni of Corpus Christi College, Cambridge
20th-century British medical doctors
Physicians of Hospital for Special Surgery
20th-century surgeons